Rosedinnick is a small hamlet in Cornwall, England. It is near the village of Talskiddy, in the north of the parish of St Columb Major.

The hamlet consists of a small number of dwellings, including two farmhouses. The name originates from the Cornish for "furzy hillspur".

References

Hamlets in Cornwall